The 1933 Nova Scotia general election was held on 22 August 1933 to elect members of the 40th House of Assembly of the Province of Nova Scotia, Canada. It was won by the Liberal party.

Results

Results by party

Retiring incumbents
Liberal
William Chisholm, Antigonish
René W.E. Landry, Yarmouth
Michael M. Morrison, Guysborough
Wishart McLea Robertson, Shelburne

Liberal-Conservative
Robert Hamilton Butts, Cape Breton East
Reginald Tucker Caldwell, Kings
Robert Albert Douglas, Pictou
Donald W. MacKay, Queens
Harry Thompson MacKenzie, Annapolis
Hugh Allan MacQuarrie, Pictou
Daniel George McKenzie, Cumberland
James A. Proudfoot, Inverness

Nominated candidates
Legend
bold denotes party leader
† denotes an incumbent who is not running for re-election or was defeated in nomination contest

Valley

|-
|rowspan=2 bgcolor=whitesmoke|Annapolis
|rowspan=2|
|rowspan=2|Obediah Parker Goucher3,96744.65%
|rowspan=2 |
|rowspan=2|John D. McKenzie4,91755.35%
|rowspan=2|
|rowspan=2|
|rowspan=2|
|rowspan=2|
||
|Obediah Parker Goucher
|-
||
|Harry Thompson MacKenzie†
|-
|rowspan=2 bgcolor=whitesmoke|Digby
|rowspan=2|
|rowspan=2|Jean-Louis Philippe Robicheau3,70340.80%
|rowspan=2 |
|rowspan=2|Joseph William Comeau5,37259.20%
|rowspan=2|
|rowspan=2|
|rowspan=2|
|rowspan=2|
||
|Joseph William Comeau
|-
||
|Alexander Stirling MacMillan
|-
|rowspan=2 bgcolor=whitesmoke|Hants
|rowspan=2|
|rowspan=2|Albert Parsons4,60346.35%
|rowspan=2 |
|rowspan=2|Alexander Stirling MacMillan5,32853.65%
|rowspan=2|
|rowspan=2|
|rowspan=2|
|rowspan=2|
||
|Albert Parsons
|-
||
|Vacant
|-
|rowspan=2 bgcolor=whitesmoke|Kings
|rowspan=2|
|rowspan=2|George Nowlan6,09847.65%
|rowspan=2 |
|rowspan=2|John Alexander McDonald6,70052.35%
|rowspan=2|
|rowspan=2|
|rowspan=2|
|rowspan=2|
||
|George Nowlan
|-
||
|Reginald Tucker Caldwell†
|}

South Shore

|-
|rowspan=2 bgcolor=whitesmoke|Lunenburg
|
|Wallace Norman Rehfuss6,74421.78%
||
|Frank R. Davis8,36927.03%
|
|
|
|
||
|Vacant
|-
|
|Melbourne M. Gardner7,04922.77%
||
|Gordon E. Romkey8,79928.42%
|
|
|
|
||
|Gordon E. Romkey
|-
|rowspan=2 bgcolor=whitesmoke|Queens
|rowspan=2 |
|rowspan=2|Seth M. Bartling2,88050.91%
|rowspan=2|
|rowspan=2|Roland M. Irving2,77749.09%
|rowspan=2|
|rowspan=2|
|rowspan=2|
|rowspan=2|
||
|Donald W. MacKay†
|-
||
|Vacant
|-
|rowspan=2 bgcolor=whitesmoke|Shelburne
|rowspan=2|
|rowspan=2|James W. Maddin2,50043.46%
|rowspan=2 |
|rowspan=2|Henry R. L. Bill3,25256.54%
|rowspan=2|
|rowspan=2|
|rowspan=2|
|rowspan=2|
||
|Henry R. L. Bill
|-
||
|Wishart McLea Robertson†
|-
|rowspan=2 bgcolor=whitesmoke|Yarmouth 
|rowspan=2|
|rowspan=2|Alvin L. Chipman3,64638.49%
|rowspan=2 |
|rowspan=2|Lindsay C. Gardner5,82661.51%
|rowspan=2|
|rowspan=2|
|rowspan=2|
|rowspan=2|
||
|Lindsay C. Gardner
|-
||
|René W.E. Landry†
|}

Fundy-Northeast

|-
|rowspan=2 bgcolor=whitesmoke|Colchester
||
|William A. Flemming6,74827.04%
|
|Thomas R. Johnson6,04324.21%
|
|
|
|
||
|William A. Flemming
|-
||
|George Y. Thomas6,39825.64%
|
|R. Edgar McLeod5,76923.11%
|
|
|
|
||
|Vacant
|-
|rowspan=3 bgcolor=whitesmoke|Cumberland
|
|Archibald Terris8,29122.73%
||
|John S. Smiley9,54026.15%
|
|
|
|
||
|Archibald Terris
|-
|rowspan=2 |
|rowspan=2|Percy Chapman Black9,40625.78%
|rowspan=2|
|rowspan=2|Earle B. Paul9,24225.34%
|rowspan=2|
|rowspan=2|
|rowspan=2|
|rowspan=2|
||
|Percy Chapman Black
|-
||
|Daniel George McKenzie†
|}

Halifax/Dartmouth/Eastern Shore

|-
|bgcolor=whitesmoke|Halifax Centre
|
|Russell McInnes3,96743.94%
||
|Guy Murray Logan4,91554.44%
|
|Joseph S. Wallace1461.62%
|
|
||
|VacantHalifax
|-
|bgcolor=whitesmoke|Halifax East
|
|Josiah Frederick Fraser5,59547.14%
||
|Geoffrey W. Stevens6,27352.86%
|
|
|
|
||
|Josiah Frederick FraserHalifax
|-
|bgcolor=whitesmoke|Halifax North
|
|Gerald P. Flavin3,41038.48%
||
|Gordon Benjamin Isnor5,45261.52%
|
|
|
|
||
|Gordon Benjamin IsnorHalifax
|-
|bgcolor=whitesmoke|Halifax South
|
|George H. Murphy4,32546.66%
||
|Angus Lewis Macdonald4,94553.34%
|
|
|
|
||
|George Henry MurphyHalifax
|-
|bgcolor=whitesmoke|Halifax West
|
|Angus MacDonald Morton3,95745.17%
||
|George E. Hagen4,80454.83%
|
|
|
|
||
|Angus MacDonald MortonHalifax
|}

Central Nova

|-
|rowspan=2 bgcolor=whitesmoke|Antigonish 
|rowspan=2|
|rowspan=2|John A. Walker2,48245.68%
|rowspan=2 |
|rowspan=2|John L. MacIsaac2,95154.32%
|rowspan=2|
|rowspan=2|
|rowspan=2|
|rowspan=2|
||
|John L. MacIsaac
|-
||
|William Chisholm†
|-
|rowspan=2 bgcolor=whitesmoke|Guysborough
|rowspan=2|
|rowspan=2|Leonard W. Fraser3,40843.44%
|rowspan=2 |
|rowspan=2|Clarence W. Anderson4,43756.56%
|rowspan=2|
|rowspan=2|
|rowspan=2|
|rowspan=2|
||
|Clarence W. Anderson
|-
||
|Michael E. Morrison†
|-
|rowspan=3 bgcolor=whitesmoke|Pictou
|
|John Doull8,54622.10%
||
|Donald F. Fraser10,37726.83%
|
|
|
|
||
|John Doull
|-
|rowspan=2|
|rowspan=2|John W. MacLeod8,86122.91%
|rowspan=2 |
|rowspan=2|Josiah H. MacQuarrie10,88728.15%
|rowspan=2|
|rowspan=2|
|rowspan=2|
|rowspan=2|
||
|Hugh Allan MacQuarrie†
|-
||
|Robert Albert Douglas†
|}

Cape Breton

|-
|rowspan=2 bgcolor=whitesmoke|Cape Breton Centre
|rowspan=2|
|rowspan=2|Neil R. McArthur2,96943.53%
|rowspan=2 |
|rowspan=2|Michael Dwyer3,26347.84%
|rowspan=2|
|rowspan=2|
|rowspan=2|
|rowspan=2|Thomas Ling5888.62%
||
|Gordon Sidney Harrington
|-
||
|Joseph Macdonald
|-
|rowspan=2 bgcolor=whitesmoke|Cape Breton East
|rowspan=2|
|rowspan=2|Daniel R. Cameron3,63238.97%
|rowspan=2 |
|rowspan=2|Lauchlin Daniel Currie3,65539.21%
|rowspan=2|
|rowspan=2|James B. McLachlan1,73718.64%
|rowspan=2|
|rowspan=2|Donald O. Fraser2973.19%
||
|Daniel R. Cameron
|-
||
|Robert Hamilton Butts†
|-
|bgcolor=whitesmoke|Cape Breton North
||
|Joseph Macdonald4,44847.50%
|
|Luke Daye4,33046.24%
|
|John McDonald5866.26%
|
|
||
|New riding
|-
|bgcolor=whitesmoke|Cape Breton South
||
|Gordon Sidney Harrington4,75743.81%
|
|Malcolm A. Patterson4,65042.83%
|
|
|
|Lauchlin D. McKay1,45113.36%
||
|New riding
|-
|bgcolor=whitesmoke|Cape Breton West
||
|Weldon W. Patton3,03653.49%
|
|Alonzo Martell2,64046.51%
|
|
|
|
||
|Alonzo MartellRichmond-West Cape Breton
|-
|rowspan=2 bgcolor=whitesmoke|Inverness
|rowspan=2|
|rowspan=2|Hubert Meen Aucoin4,86246.36%
|rowspan=2 |
|rowspan=2|Moses Elijah McGarry5,62653.64%
|rowspan=2|
|rowspan=2|
|rowspan=2|
|rowspan=2|
||
|Moses Elijah McGarry
|-
||
|James A. Proudfoot†
|-
|bgcolor=whitesmoke|Richmond
|
|Benjamin A. LeBlanc2,60346.46%
||
|George R. Deveau3,00053.54%
|
|
|
|
||
|VacantRichmond-West Cape Breton
|-
|rowspan=2 bgcolor=whitesmoke|Victoria
|rowspan=2 |
|rowspan=2|Frederick Walker Baldwin2,21652.18%
|rowspan=2|
|rowspan=2|Donald Buchanan McLeod2,03147.82%
|rowspan=2|
|rowspan=2|
|rowspan=2|
|rowspan=2|
||
|Donald Buchanan McLeod
|-
||
|Vacant
|}

References

Notes

Further reading
 

1933
1933 elections in Canada
General election
August 1933 events